The Stone Barn on Brushy Creek, also known as the Ball Barn, is a historic and unusual stone barn which was listed on the National Register of Historic Places in 1983.  It is located on U.S. Route 68 in Nicholas County, Kentucky near Carlisle.

It is a  dry stone barn.

It is a "unique stone barn with connection to slave trade".

References

Barns on the National Register of Historic Places in Kentucky		
National Register of Historic Places in Nicholas County, Kentucky